The 1961–62 Texas Tech Red Raiders men's basketball team represented Texas Tech University in the Southwest Conference during the 1961–62 NCAA University Division men's basketball season. The head coach was Gene Gibson, his 1st year with the team. Gibson replaced Polk Robison who became the Texas Tech athletic director. The Red Raiders played their home games in the Lubbock Municipal Coliseum in Lubbock, Texas.

References

Texas Tech Red Raiders basketball seasons
Texas Tech
Texas Tech
Texas Tech